Joe Kato Caletti (加藤 カレッティ 丈, Katō Karetti Jō, born 14 September 1998) is an Australian professional footballer who plays as a central midfielder for Tochigi City FC.

Career

Caletti joined Brisbane Roar in January 2016 after previously playing for the FFA Centre of Excellence, where he was named Player of the Season twice. At the age of 18, he debuted for Brisbane Roar. In mid 2019, Caletti was released by Brisbane Roar and was without club for a few months before signing for 3rd tier club Florø in Norway.
Caletti is a former captain of the Australia national under-17 football team, captaining the team at 2015 FIFA U-17 World Cup in Chile.

In 25 July 2022, Caletti signed to Kantō Soccer League club Tochigi City FC from Adelaide United.

Personal life
Caletti is half Japanese, half Italian, however Kuala Lumpur, Malaysia born his place. Due to his Father is Italian-Australia and Mother is Japanese. He moved to Australia at youth age. Besides his home-country, he has played in Norway and Japan.

Playing style
Caletti is widely accredited for his high work rate and willingness to compete in the midfield despite his small stature. His composure on the ball and ability to execute crucial passes has led to comparisons with former Brisbane Roar player Massimo Murdocca.

References

External links

1998 births
Living people
Association football midfielders
Australian soccer players
Australian people of Italian descent
Australian people of Japanese descent
Australia youth international soccer players
Brisbane Roar FC players
Adelaide United FC players
A-League Men players
National Premier Leagues players
Australian expatriate soccer players
Expatriate footballers in Norway
Australian expatriate sportspeople in Norway
Florø SK players
Expatriate footballers in Japan
Australian expatriate sportspeople in Japan
 Tochigi City FC players